Krasnogvardeysky District is an administrative district (raion), one of the twenty-one in Belgorod Oblast, Russia. Municipally, it is incorporated as Krasnogvardeysky Municipal District. It is located in the eastern central part of the oblast. Its administrative center is the town of Biryuch. Population:   44,156 (2002 Census);  The population of Biryuch accounts for 22.1% of the district's total population.

History
The district was established in July 1928.

References

Notes

Sources

Districts of Belgorod Oblast
 

